The 1990 NCAA Division I Field Hockey Championship was the tenth women's collegiate field hockey tournament organized by the National Collegiate Athletic Association, to determine the top college field hockey team in the United States. The Old Dominion Lady Monarchs won their fifth championship, defeating the North Carolina Tar Heels in the final, a rematch of the previous year's final. The championship rounds were held at Bauer Field in Piscataway, New Jersey on the campus of Rutgers University.

Bracket

References 

1990
Field Hockey
1990 in women's field hockey
1990 in sports in New Jersey
Women's sports in New Jersey